The Dagohoy rebellion, also known as the Dagohoy revolution and the Dagohoy revolt, is considered as the longest rebellion in Philippine history. Led by Francisco Dagohoy, or Francisco Sendrijas, the rebellion took place on the island of Bohol from 1744 to 1829, lasting for roughly 85 years.

It was one of two significant revolts that occurred in Bohol during the Spanish era. The other one was the Tamblot uprising in 1621 led by Tamblot, a babaylan or native priest from Bohol which was basically a religious conflict.

Legacy

The Dagohoy rebellion features in the Bohol provincial flag as one of the two Sunday or native swords with handle and hand-guards on top. These two sundang, which are reclining respectively towards the left and right, depict the Dagohoy and Tamblot revolts, symbolizing  that "a true Boholano  will rise and fight if supervening factors embroil them into something beyond reason or tolerance."

The town of Dagohoy, Bohol is named in his honor. It was Vice President Carlos P. Garcia who proposed the name "Dagohoy" in honor of Francisco Sendrijas alias Dagohoy. The name Dagohoy is a concatenation of the Visayan phrase Dagon sa huyuhoy or "talisman of the breeze" in English.

The Dagohoy Memorial National High School in Dagohoy, Bohol is also named in his honor and memory.

References 

Dagohoy Revolution
 Tirol, Jes End of Dagohoy Revolution Part 1
 Tirol, Jes. End of Dagohoy Revolution Part 2
Datuamaipakpakelementaryschool

Related Literature

Agoncillo, Teodoro A. History of the Filipino People. GAROTECH Publishing, 1990 (8th Edition).
Arcila, Jose S. Rizal and the Emergence of the Philippine Nation. 2001 revised edition.
Constantino, Renato. The Philippines: A Past Revisited. Tala Publishing Series, 1975.
Corpuz, Onofre D. The Roots of the Filipino Nation. 1989.
Scott, William Henry. Barangay: Sixteenth-Century Philippine Culture and Society. AdMU: 1994.
Zaide, Gregorio F. Great Filipinos in History: An Epic of Filipino Greatness in War and Peace. Verde Bookstore, 1970.
Zaide, Gregorio. Dagohoy: Champion of Philippine Freedom. Manila: Enriquez, Alduan and Co., 1941.

External links
 Pugay, Chris Antonette P.The Revolts before the Revolution www.nhi.gov.ph

18th-century rebellions
19th-century rebellions
History of Bohol
Visayan history
History of the Philippines (1565–1898)
Philippine revolts against Spain
18th century in the Philippines
19th century in the Philippines
1829 in the Philippines
1744 in the Philippines